Jürgen Elsner (born 22 April 1932) is a German music ethnologist and author.

Life 
Born in Finsterwalde, Elsner studied music theory, musicology and Arabic studies at the Hochschule für Musik "Hanns Eisler" and the Humboldt-Universität zu Berlin. From 1958 to 1964, he was a research assistant at the Institute for Musicology there. In 1964, he was awarded a doctorate with the dissertation Zum vokalsolistischen Vortrag der Eislerschen Kampfmusik. In 1970, he habilitated with the thesis Zum vokalsolistischen Vortrag der Eislerschen Kampfmusik Der Begriff des maqam in Ägypten in neuerer Zeit. He then taught music history and music ethnology at the Humboldt University in Berlin and the Leipzig University. From 1975 to 1993, he was Professor of Music Ethnology at the Humboldt University of Berlin and from 1979 to 1990 he was head of the musicology department.

Awards 
 1971: Hanns Eisler Prize

Publications

As author 
 with Nathan Notowicz: Hanns Eisler. Quellennachweise. Deutscher Verlag für Musik, Leipzig 1966.
 Zur vokalsolistischen Vortragsweise der Kampfmusik Hanns Eislers. Deutscher Verlag für Musik, Leipzig 1971. (Beiträge zur musikwissenschaftlichen Forschung in der DDR, vol. 1)
 Der Begriff des maqām in Ägypten in neuerer Zeit. Deutscher Verlag für Musik, Leipzig 1973. (Beiträge zur musikwissenschaftlichen Forschung in der DDR, vol. 5)
 with Paul Collaer: Nordafrika. Deutscher Verlag für Musik, Leipzig 1983.

As editor 
 with Givi Ordžonikidze: Sozialistische Musikkultur. Traditionen, Probleme, Perspektiven. 2 volumes, Verlag Neue Musik, Berlin 1977/83.
 Die Musik der Alten Welt in Ost und West. Aufstieg und Entwicklung. Akademie-Verlag, Berlin 1968. 
 Wir reden hier nicht von Napoleon, wir reden von Ihnen! Gespräche mit Hanns Eisler und Gerhart Eisler. Verlag Neue Musik, Berlin 1971.
 with Carola Schramm: Dichtung und Wahrheit – die Legendenbildung um Ernst Busch. 2 volumes, Trafo-Verlag, Berlin 2006,  /

Further reading 
 Jürgen Elsner: Elsner, Jürgen. In MGG Online, November 2016 (Musik in Geschichte und Gegenwart, 2001)
 Horst Seeger, Gisa Jähnichen: Elsner, Jürgen. In Oxford Music Online

References

External links 

German ethnomusicologists
20th-century German non-fiction writers
Academic staff of the Humboldt University of Berlin
Academic staff of Leipzig University
1932 births
Living people
People from Finsterwalde